Lô Borges (Born Salomão Borges Filho on January 10, 1952) is a Brazilian songwriter, singer, and guitarist. He was one of the founders of Clube da Esquina, a group of musicians that originated in the Brazilian state of Minas Gerais. He co-authored with Milton Nascimento the album Clube da Esquina in 1972, which was a milestone in Brazilian popular music. Among his most famous compositions are "Paisagem da Janela", "Para Lennon e McCartney", "Clube da Esquina No. 2", "Trem de Doido", and "O Trem Azul".

Discography
1972: Clube da Esquina (with Milton Nascimento)
1972: Lô Borges1979:  A Via-Láctea1980:  Os Borges1981:  Nuvem Cigana1984:  Sonho Real1987: Solo - Ao Vivo 1996:  Meu Filme2001: Feira Moderna2003: Um Dia e Meio2006:  Bhanda2008: Harmonia2010: Horizonte Vertical''

References

External links 
Official Web site of Lô Borges
Official MySpace of Lô Borges

1952 births
Living people
20th-century Brazilian male singers
20th-century Brazilian singers
People from Belo Horizonte
Brazilian male guitarists
EMI Records artists
Culture in Minas Gerais